Cassandra Stanwell O'Connor (born 1 April 1967) is an Australian politician, who has been a Tasmanian Greens member of the Tasmanian House of Assembly since 2008, representing the electorate of Division of Denison which was renamed to Clark in September 2018.

One of two Greens in the eight member cabinet, O'Connor was Minister for Human Services, Community Development, Climate Change and Aboriginal Affairs in the Bartlett and Giddings cabinets from 2011 until 2014.

On 12 June 2015, O'Connor was confirmed as the new Greens leader in Tasmania, after the resignation of Kim Booth.

Early career
She became well known in Tasmania as the face of the "Save Ralphs Bay" campaign. This community campaign began in March 2004, when Sydney-based developer Walker Corporation announced its intention to construct Tasmania's first canal housing estate in the Ralphs Bay Conservation Area east of Hobart. In June 2010 the legal confirmation of the Ralphs Bay Conservation Area as being 171 hectares came into effect, therefore preventing Walker Corporations proposed canal housing estates.

Political career

O'Connor finished second on the Tasmanian Greens Denison ticket in 2006 with 3.6% of the primary vote. She received 70% of Tasmanian Greens Leader Peg Putt's preferences and eventually reached almost half a quota before being excluded. She first won the seat of Denison on a countback of votes on 21 July 2008 after the sitting member and leader of the Tasmanian Greens Peg Putt resigned earlier in the month.

Cassy O'Connor was re-elected at the 2010 election, receiving the highest number of first preference votes in Denison with 16.2%.

On 19 April 2010, Labor Premier David Bartlett appointed Ms O'Connor as Secretary to Cabinet. In November 2010 she was promoted within the Bartlett cabinet, holding two portfolios. O'Connor and Nick McKim are the first Greens in Australia to hold Cabinet positions.

In 2011 O'Connor was given full Ministerial responsibility for Human Services, Community Development, Aboriginal Affairs and Climate Change. Elements of Community Development include Multicultural Affairs, Seniors, Women, Youth and Gambling. Her colleague Tasmanian Greens Leader Nick McKim MP was Minister for Education, Sustainable Transport, and Corrections and Consumer Affairs.

On 16 January 2014, Premier Lara Giddings announced that the power sharing arrangement with the Tasmanian Greens was over, and that O'Connor and McKim would be replaced by Labor MPs, effective 17 January. She said that the ALP would not govern with Greens in the cabinet in future.

In a speech to parliament in November 2017, O'Connor implied that Greg Geason had been appointed to the Supreme Court of Tasmania because of his friendship with Premier Will Hodgman. Hodgman said that Geason's appointment had been made by an independent selection panel, and the Tasmanian Bar Association issued a statement calling O'Connor's remarks an attack on judicial independence that had "the potential to undermine public confidence in the Supreme Court and the administration of the law in Tasmania".

O'Connor is a critic of Chinese influence in Australia.

Personal life
In July 2009, O'Connor confirmed she was in a relationship with fellow MP and leader of the state Greens party, Nick McKim. She was previously married to Stephen Lees and has four children born prior to the relationship with McKim.

References

External links
Cassy O'Connor's page at Tasmanian Greens MPs website

1967 births
Living people
Members of the Tasmanian House of Assembly
Australian Greens members of the Parliament of Tasmania
21st-century Australian politicians
21st-century Australian women politicians
Women members of the Tasmanian House of Assembly